Temurmalik District (Nohiyai Temurmalik) is a district in the Khatlon Region of Tajikistan, located south of the Vakhsh Range along the middle course of the river Kyzylsu. It had an estimated population of 69,800 as of 2020. Before 1957, it was called Qizil-Mazor District or Kzyl-Mazar District, then renamed Sovetskiy District, and in 2004 given its present name Temurmalik District. The new name honors a medieval military hero, Timur Malik, who in 1220 led the people of Khujand in their struggle against the Mongol occupation.

In 2012, Tajikistan experienced one of the harshest winters in 50 years resulting in major flooding as the snow melted. Kiblay Village in the Temurmalik District was one of the most heavily damaged areas within Tajikistan as a result of the floods.

Administrative divisions
They are as follows:

References

Districts of Khatlon Region
Districts of Tajikistan